Frederick Alan "Fred" Stewart  (born July 8, 1934) is a former politician from Alberta, Canada.

Political career
Stewart was first elected to the Legislative Assembly of Alberta in the electoral district of Calgary North Hill in the 1986 general election. He defeated Noel Jantzie of the NDP and two other candidates to hold the district for the Progressive Conservatives. He was re-elected in the 1989 general election over Pauline Kay of the Liberals and two other candidates.  He retired at the end of his second term in office.

References

External links
Legislative Assembly of Alberta Members Listing

Progressive Conservative Association of Alberta MLAs
Living people
Members of the Executive Council of Alberta
1934 births